Carex tonsa, also known as shaved sedge, is a species of flowering plant in the sedge family, Cyperaceae. It is native to Canada and the Eastern United States.

See also
 List of Carex species

References

tonsa
Plants described in 1908
Flora of North America